Enzo Favio Fortuny Romero (born June 7, 1981) is a Mexican voice actor and ADR director. He was born in Mexico City. While he remains as a specialist in young men's voices, his range is ample enough to allow him to portray either gentler roles (like Yukito Tsukishiro) or much rougher ones (like InuYasha). He was also the Disney XD channel speaker in Hispanic America and the official Mexican dub-over artist of Drake Bell and Elijah Wood.

Filmography
 Wilfred (2011–2014) - Ryan Newman 
 Mi Pobre Angelito (1990) - Kevin McCallister (voiceover for Macaulay Culkin)
 Mi Pobre Angelito 2: Perdido en Nueva York (1990) - Kevin McCallister (voiceover for Macaulay Culkin)
 Barney y Sus Amigos (1992–1993) - Michael (voiceover for Brian Eppes)
 Babe, el Puerquito Valiente (1995) - Babe
 Toy Story (1995) - Sid Phillips 
 Neon Genesis Evangelion (1997–1998) - Makoto Hyuga
 Babe, el Puerquito va a la Ciudad (1998)- Babe
 Cardcaptor Sakura (1998–2000) - Yukito Tsukishiro
 (1998) - Tombo
 Digimon Adventure 02 (2001) - Tai Kamiya
 Lady and the Tramp 2 (2001) - Scamp
 Hey Arnold! (2000–04) - Arnold
 Lizzie McGuire (2001–04) - Gordo
 El Señor de los Anillos: La Comunidad del Anillo (2001) - Frodo Bolson (voiceover for Elijah Wood)
 InuYasha (2002–06) - InuYasha
 E.T. the Extra-Terrestrial 20th Anniversary Special Edition (2002) - Michael (voiceover for Robert MacNaughton)
 El Señor de los Anillos: Las Dos Torres (2002) - Frodo Bolson (voiceover for Elijah Wood)
 Hey Arnold!: The Movie (2002) - Arnold
 Es Tan Raven (2003–2007) - Max
 Mini Espías 3-D: Game Over (2003) - El Sujeto (voiceover for Elijah Wood)
 Lupin III: El Misterio de Mamo (2003) - Howard Lockewood, a.k.a. Mamo
 El Señor de los Anillos: El Regreso del Rey (2003) - Frodo Bolson (voiceover for Elijah Wood)
X-Men 2 United (2003) - Iceman (Voiceover For Shawn Ashmore)
 Thomas & Friends (2004-) - James
 Drake & Josh (2004–07) - Drake Parker
 Kim Possible (2002–07) - Ron Stoppable (Ron Imparable)
 The Life and Times of Juniper Lee (2005–07) - Dennis Lee
 The Weekenders (2000–04) - Tino Tonitini
 Codename: Kids Next Door (2004–07) - Heinrich von Marzipan 
 Growing Up Creepie (2006–2008) - Skipper
 Pokémon (2006-) - Additional voices-lance 
 Naruto (2006-) - Kiba Inuzuka
 X-Men The Last Stand (2006) - Iceman (Voiceover For Shawn Ashmore)
 Eragon (2006) - Eragon (voiceover for Edward Speleers)
 Shrek Tercero (2007) - Artie
 Mi Pobre Angelito 4- Kevin McCallister
 Rocket Power (1999–2004) - Pi Piston
 Wayside (2007–08) - Joe and Dimitri
 Disney's Doug (1996–99) - Doug
 The Hangover (2009) - Doug Billings (Voiceover For Justin Bartha)
 The Hangover Part II (2011) - Doug Billings (Voiceover For Justin Bartha)
 The Hobbit: An Unexpected Journey (2012) - Frodo Bolson (voiceover for Elijah Wood)
 The Hangover Part III (2013) - Doug Billings (Voiceover For Justin Bartha)
 X-Men Days Of Future Past (2014) - Iceman (Voiceover For Shawn Ashmore)
 Cardcaptor Sakura (2000) - Yukito Tsukihiro/Yue
 Bionicle 3. La red de las sombras (2005) - Vakama
 Ninjago: Masters of Spinjitzu (2012–13) - Cole
 Mortal Kombat X (2015) - Takeda
 My Little Pony: Friendship Is Magic (2016) - Quibble Pants
 Kitty Is Not a Cat (2018) - Miley

References 

1981 births
Living people
20th-century Mexican male actors
21st-century Mexican male actors
Mexican male voice actors
Male actors from Mexico City
Mexican voice directors